Max David Bacon (1 March 1904, London, England – 3 December 1969, London, England) was a British actor, comedian and musician (drummer and occasional vocalist in Ambrose's band).  Although he was British-born, his comedic style centred on his pseudo-European, Yiddish accent and in his straight-faced mispronunciation of words.

Biography
Bacon's father came from a leather-working family to London from Katowice, then in Galicia in the Austro-Hungarian Empire. In London, his father worked as a basket-weaver.

Before becoming a character actor, Bacon was a drummer in Britain during the 1920s and 1930s. He was taught by the vocalist and drummer Harry Bentley. After a couple of years at the Florida Club with Ronnie Munro's band he began a long association with Ambrose's Orchestra, with whom he recorded as drummer and occasionally as Yiddish vocalist. In the late 1930s he had become well known enough to tour the halls in his own right and as part of a touring unit known as the Ambrose Octet with Evelyn Dall, among others.

He lived in his later years at The White House, a hotel near Great Portland Street, London, now known as the Melia White House, in Albany Street. He never married.

Partial filmography

 Soft Lights and Sweet Music (1936) - Himself
 Calling All Stars (1937) - Himself
 Kicking the Moon Around (1938) - Gus
 King Arthur Was a Gentleman (1942) - Maxie
 Miss London Ltd. (1943) - Romero
 Bees in Paradise (1944) - Max Adler
 Give Us the Moon (1944) - Jacobus
 Cuckoo College (1949, TV Movie) - English Master
 The Gambler and the Lady (1952) - Maxie
 Take a Powder (1953) - Maxie
 The Diary of Anne Frank (London theatre production 1955)
 Together Again (1957, TV Series)
 Musical Playhouse (1959, TV Series) - Bookmaker
 William Tell (1959, TV Series) - Cobbler
 The Crowning Touch (1959) - Bemberger
 No Hiding Place (1959, TV Series) - Charlie Locke
 Educating Archie (1959, TV Series)
 The Entertainer (1960) - Charlie Klein
 The Rag Trade (1961, TV Series) - Mr. Conway
 Play It Cool (1962) - Lotus Proprietor
 Ghost Squad (1963, TV Series) - Sam
 Love Story (1963, TV Series) - Mr Rosen
 Z-Cars (1964, TV Series) - Nagle
 The Eyes of Annie Jones (1964) - Publican Hoskins
 Crooks in Cloisters (1964) - Bookmaker
 Gideon's Way (1964, TV Series) - Bookie Thompson
 Theatre 625 (1965-1966, TV Series) - Green / Herbert Fink
 The Sandwich Man (1966) - Chef
 Privilege (1967) - Julie Jordan
 The Whisperers (1967) - Mr. Fish
 The Wednesday Play (1967, TV Series) - Coldshead
 Chitty Chitty Bang Bang (1968) - Orchestra Leader
 The Nine Ages of Nakedness (1969) - Yossel (segment "The Egyptians")
 Detective (1969, TV Series) - Aaronson
 Along the Way (1972) - (final film role)

References

External links

Bacon at The Dance Band Encyclopedia

1904 births
1969 deaths
English male film actors
Male actors from London
20th-century English male actors
20th-century English comedians
English drummers